Suj Tilla or Suitilla is a Himalayan peak located on the eastern side of Uttarakhand state in Pithoragarh District of India. The peak is located above the junction of Kalabaland, Sankalp and Yankchar glaciers. Ralam Dhura pass is situated to the south of this peak, which connects Ralam valley to Darma valley.

This peak is characterised by steep ice-flutings and sharp ridges, so named as Peak of needles. This peak was first climbed in 2001 by an Indo-British joint expedition by two Britishers Graham Little and Jim Lowther. The Indian navy team was led by  Lt. Cdr. Satyabrata Dam. The climbers who made the  summit are Divyesh Muni, Lt. Amit Pande, Sherpa Nima Dorje, Lt. K S Balaji, Lt. Amit Rajora, Chera Rajkumar, A. Chaudhury, Sherpa Tsange, Puri and Nima Thondup. The most popular route to the summit is through the south west face.

About 200 m away from Suj Tilla is Suj Tilla East (6394 m). This peak is still unclimbed due to multiple cornices on the ridge.

References

Geography of Pithoragarh district
Mountains of Uttarakhand